On 16 June 2016, Boko Haram carried out a mass shooting at a funeral in Kuda, Nigeria.

During the evening of 16 June 2016, a group of gunmen from jihadist group Boko Haram arrived in Kuda, a village near Madagali in the north of Adamawa State, northeastern Nigeria, on motorcycles. At the time, the funeral of a local leader was taking place. The militants opened fire on the mourners, killing at least 18 of them and injuring at least 10 others. The insurgents also looted food and burnt homes.

Boko Haram had previously attacked the village in February 2016.

References

Murder in Adamawa State
Terrorist incidents in Adamawa State